Yulihan Alejandra Luna Ávila (born 21 February 1994) is a Mexican professional boxer. She is a two-weight world champion, having held the WBC female bantamweight title since 2020 and the IBF female junior featherweight title from 2014 to 2016.

Professional career
Luna made her professional debut on 28 October 2011, scoring a four-round unanimous decision (UD) victory against Sandra Paulido at the Gimnasio Hermanos Rojas in Gómez Palacio, Mexico. She suffered the first defeat of her career in her next fight, losing by UD over four rounds against Araceli Palacios in May 2012. 

After a nine-fight winning streak, she challenged Jéssica Gónzalez for the WBC female interim bantamweight title on 28 June 2014, at the Centro de Espectaculos in Epazoyucan, Mexico. Luna suffered her second defeat, losing by ten-round UD.

Following a UD victory against Samantha Estrada in August, Luna faced former WBA female interim super flyweight champion Carolina Marcela Gutiérrez for the vacant IBF female junior featherweight title on 15 November at the Quorum Hotel in Córdoba, Argentina. All three judges scored the bout 99–91 in favour of Luna, awarding her the IBF title via UD. In her next fight she faced IFBA junior featherweight champion Maureen Shea on 29 August 2015, at The Forum in Inglewood, California. Luna used her height advantage and elected to fight at a distance, using movement and picking her moments to engage while Shea was the aggressor, pressing the action to fight on the inside. After the ten rounds were complete, one judge scored the bout 97–93 in favour of Luna, the second judge scored it 98–92 to Shea, while the third scored it even at 95–95 to see both boxers retain their titles through a split draw.

She spent two years away from boxing after giving birth, making her return in September 2017 with an eight-round UD victory against Katia De La Parra. Luna followed up with three more wins before suffering her third defeat, losing via UD in a non-title bout against reigning WBC female super flyweight champion Guadalupe Martínez Guzmán in November 2018.

She scored three more wins before facing WBC female bantamweight champion Mariana Juárez on 31 October 2020, at the Grand Oasis Arena in Cancún, Mexico. After a one-sided fight in which Juárez took punishment throughout, two judges scored the bout 100–90 and the third scored it 99–91, all in favour of Luna, awarding her the WBC title via UD to become a two-weight world champion. 

Juárez caused controversy after the final bell rang; walking across the ring to shout at Luna, accusing her of cheating. Juárez also interrupted Luna's post-fight interview to make her accusations known, saying, "I've been in this sport for 21 years, There's something in those gloves and they know it. The WBC will look into it." Luna responded by saying, "The gloves and hand wraps are [at ringside]. We are athletes. We know how to win. We know how to lose. She was saying that the laces were higher than normal, as if that's the part of the glove I hit her with. We won because of the hard work we did. If she wants a rematch, I'll give it to her. We're not afraid. They can inspect the gloves all they want." Luna's hand wraps and gloves were examined by representatives of the WBC and determined to be legal before the result was announced.

Professional boxing record

References

External links

Living people
1994 births
Mexican women boxers
Boxers from Durango
Bantamweight boxers
Super-bantamweight boxers
International Boxing Federation champions
World Boxing Council champions
World bantamweight boxing champions
World super-bantamweight boxing champions
People from Gómez Palacio, Durango